Val-de-Dagne is a commune in the Aude department in southern France. The municipality was established on 1 January 2019 by merger of the former communes of Montlaur and Pradelles-en-Val.

See also
Communes of the Aude department

References

Communes of Aude
Communes nouvelles of Aude
Populated places established in 2019
2019 establishments in France